The Daytime Emmy Award for Outstanding Cinematography is given by the National Academy of Television Arts and Sciences in the US for single-camera work in daytime television. The Daytime Emmy Awards are among the more prominent categories of Emmy Award.

Winners and Nominees 
Winners in bold

Outstanding Individual Achievement in Religious Programming

1970s 
1976
 A Determining Force (NBC)
1978
 Continuing Creation (NBC)
1979
 This Other Eden (NBC)

Outstanding Individual Achievement in Children's Programming

1970s 
1978
 NBC Special Treat ("Five Finger Discount") (NBC)
1979
 The Big Blue Marble (SYN)
 The Big Blue Marble (SYN)
 NBC Special Treat ("Rodeo Red and the Runaway") (NBC)

1980s 
1980
 ABC Afterschool Special ("A Movie Star's Daughter") (ABC)
 ABC Weekend Special ("The Gold Bug") (ABC)
 CBS Library ("Once Upon a Midnight Dreary") (CBS)
 Sesame Street (PBS)
 3-2-1 Contact ("Mountain Climbing" and "Hot/Cold") (PBS)

Special Classification - Individual Achievement

1980s 
1980
 The Big Blue Marble ("Witch's Sister: Chapter 2") (SYN)

Outstanding Individual Achievement in Religious Programming - Cinematographer

1980s 
1981
 Work and Worship: The Legacy of St. Benedict (NBC)

Outstanding Achievement in Any Area of Creative Technical Crafts - Cinematography

1980s 
1982
 The Body Human (The Loving Process: Men) (CBS)
1983
 New Wilderness (SYN)

Outstanding Cinematography in Children's Programming

1980s 
1981
 The Big Blue Marble (SYN)
 The Big Blue Marble ("New Jersey/Egypt") (SYN)
 The Body Human ("Facts for Boys") (CBS)
 ABC Afterschool Special ("Stoned") (ABC)
 Mandy's Grandmother (SYN)
1982
 The Big Blue Marble ("Horsemen of Inner Mongolia") (SYN)
 ABC Afterschool Special ("Daddy, I'm Their Mama Now") (ABC)
 The Body Human ("Becoming a Woman") (CBS)
1983
 CBS Afternoon Playhouse ("The Shooting") (CBS)
 CBS Library ("Robbers, Rooftops and Witches") (CBS)
1984
 ABC Afterschool Special ("Andrea's Story: A Hitchhiking Tragedy") (ABC)
 ABC Afterschool Special ("The Hand Me Down Kid") (ABC)
 ABC Weekend Special ("Cougar") (ABC)

Outstanding Cinematography

1980s 
1985
 ABC Afterschool Special ("Out of Step") (ABC)
 Kidsworld (ABC)
 ABC Afterschool Special ("Backwards: The Riddle of Dyslexia") (ABC)
1986
 CBS Schoolbreak Special ("The War Between The Classes") (CBS)
 3-2-1 Contact (PBS)
 ABC Afterschool Special ("Are You My Mother?") (ABC)
 ABC Afterschool Special ("Don't Touch") (ABC)
 ABC Weekend Special ("Pippi Longstocking") (ABC)
 CBS Schoolbreak Special ("Have You Tried Talking to Patty?") (CBS)
 CBS Schoolbreak Special ("Babies Having Babies") (CBS)
1987
 3-2-1 Contact (PBS)
 ABC Afterschool Special ("Teen Father") (ABC)
 CBS Schoolbreak Special ("God, the Universe & Hot Fudge Sundaes") (CBS)
 Pee-wee's Playhouse (CBS)
1988
 ABC Afterschool Special ("Just a Regular Kid: An AIDS Story") (ABC)
 ABC Afterschool Special ("The Day My Kid Went Punk") (ABC)
 CBS Schoolbreak Special ("Never Say Goodbye") (CBS)
 Pee-wee's Playhouse (CBS)
1989
 3-2-1 Contact (PBS)
 Pee-wee's Playhouse ("To Tell The Tooth") (CBS)

1990s 
1990
 ABC Afterschool Special ("Torn Between Two Fathers") (ABC)
 Pee-wee's Playhouse (CBS)
 China at the Crossroads (ABC)
1991
 CBS Schoolbreak Special ("But He Loves Me") (CBS)
 Pee-wee's Playhouse (CBS)
1992
 Scenic Wonders of America (Disney)
 Square One TV (PBS)
 ABC Afterschool Special ("It's Only Rock & Roll") (ABC)

Outstanding Single Camera Photography

1990s 
1993
 Great Wonders of the World ("Wonders of Nature") (Disney)
 CBS Schoolbreak Special ("50 Simple Things Kids Can Do to Save the Earth") (CBS)
 Reading Rainbow (PBS)
 ABC Afterschool Special ("Shades of a Single Protein") (ABC)
 This Old House (PBS
1994
 Reading Rainbow (PBS)
 ABC Weekend Special ("CityKids") (ABC)
 Great Wonders of the World (Disney)
 This Old House (PBS)
 The Victory Garden (PBS)
1995
 ABC Weekend Special ("Crash the Curiousaurus") (ABC)
 Beakman's World (CBS)
 Martha Stewart Living (SYN)
 Reading Rainbow (PBS)
 Mighty Morphin Power Rangers (FOC)
 This Old House (PBS)
1996
 CBS Schoolbreak Special ("My Indian Summer") (CBS)
 CBS Schoolbreak Special ("Crosstown") (CBS)
 Home Again with Bob Vila (SYN)
 Reading Rainbow (PBS)
 This Old House (PBS)
1997
 Reading Rainbow (PBS)
 Beakman's World (CBS)
 Bill Nye the Science Guy (PBS)
 Home Again with Bob Vila (SYN)
 This Old House (PBS)
1998
 Yan Can Cook (PBS)
 Beakman's World (CBS)
 Reading Rainbow (PBS)
 The Sports Illustrated for Kids Show (CBS)
 This Old House (PBS)
1999
 The Inventors' Specials ("Galileo: On the Shoulders of Giants") (HBO)
 Reading Rainbow (PBS)
 This Old House (PBS)
 Secrets of the Animal Kingdom (PBS)

2000s 
2000
 The Phantom Eye (AMC)
 Behind the Screen with John Burke (AMC)
 B. Smith with Style (SYN)
 Outward Bound (Discovery Kids)
 This Old House (PBS)
2001
 Reading Rainbow (PBS)
 Better Homes and Gardens (SYN)
 Natureworks (PBS)
 Pets: Part of the Family (PBS)
 This Old House (PBS)
2002
 Religion & Ethics Newsweekly ("The Face: Jesus in Art") (PBS)
 Behind the Screen with John Burke (AMC)
 The Book of Pooh (Disney)
 Martha Stewart Living (SYN)
 Reading Rainbow (PBS)
2003
 Our America (Showtime)
 Ask This Old House (PBS)
 Martha Stewart Living (SYN)
 Reading Rainbow (PBS)
2004
 Martha Stewart Living (SYN)
 Ask This Old House (PBS)
 Great Hotels (Travel)
 Full Frontal Fashion (WE)
 The Victory Garden (PBS)
2005
 Reading Rainbow (PBS)
 Great Hotels (Travel)
 Inside This Old House (A&E)
 This Old House (PBS)
 Travel Gear (Travel)
2006
 The Victory Garden (PBS)
 Everyday Italian (Food)
 Inside This Old House (A&E)
 This Old House (PBS)
2007
 The Victory Garden (PBS)
 Everyday Italian (Food)
 Reading Rainbow (PBS)
 This Old House (PBS)
2008
 DragonflyTV (PBS)
 Chefs A' Field (PBS)
 Design Squad (PBS)
 Dinosapien (Discovery Kids)
 Food Trip with Todd English (PBS)
2009
 Equitrekking (PBS)
 DragonflyTV (PBS)
 Flip This House (A&E)
 Johnny and the Sprites (Disney)
 This Old House (PBS)

2010s 
2010
 The Electric Company (PBS)
 Rick Steves' Iran (PBS)
 Biz Kid$ (PBS)
2011
 Joseph Rosendo's Travelscope (PBS)
 Biz Kid$ (PBS)
 The Electric Company (PBS)
 Samantha Brown's Asia ("Bali") (Travel)
2012
 Equitrekking (PBS)
 The Electric Company (PBS)
 Giada at Home (Food)
 R. L. Stine's The Haunting Hour: The Series (Hub)
 Joseph Rosendo's Travelscope (PBS)
2013
 Born to Explore with Richard Wiese (SYN)
 Equitrekking (PBS)
 Joseph Rosendo's Travelscope (PBS)
 R. L. Stine's The Haunting Hour: The Series (Hub)
 Travel Thru History (MeTV)
2014
 Giada in Paradise (Cooking)
 Jonathan Bird's Blue World (Blueworldtv.com)
 Made in Israel (ABC Family)
 The Mind of a Chef (PBS)
2015
 The Mind of a Chef (PBS)
 A Chef's Life (PBS)
 Gortimer Gibbon's Life on Normal Street (Amazon)

Outstanding Cinematography

2010s 
2016 
 The Mind of a Chef (PBS)
 A Chef's Life (PBS)
 Annedroids (Amazon)
 Joseph Rosendo's Travelscope (PBS)
 R.L. Stine's Monsterville: Cabinet of Souls (Netflix)
2017
 SuperSoul Shorts ("Maggie the Cow") (OWN)
 Family Ingredients (PBS)
 Joseph Rosendo's Travelscope (PBS)
 Rock the Park (SYN)
 Supernatural Encounters (Daystar)
2018
 Scars of Nanking (A&E)
 An American Girl Story ("Ivy & Julie 1976: A Happy Balance") (Amazon)
 Buddy Thunderstruck (Netflix)
 Family Ingredients (PBS)
 Free Rein (Netflix)
 Ocean Treks with Jeff Corwin (SYN)

References 

Cinematography